Nelsonville is a village located in the town of Philipstown in Putnam County, New York, United States. The population was 628 at the time of the 2010 census.

Nelsonville Lies in the Hudson Highlands  directly east of the village of Cold Spring. On Main Street, the border is roughly demarcated by the western property line of the Baptist Church at the height of land, and by the property line along the rear of the church lot, extending south toward the Cold Spring Cemetery.

Along with its neighbor, Cold Spring, the village is known for being a small, picturesque enclave with a historic housing stock. It is a popular weekend and fall foliage destination for New York City residents, and the origin of several well-known hiking trails that traverse the Hudson Highlands. The village is served by the Cold Spring Metro-North commuter railroad stop on the Hudson Line.

History
Nelsonville is named after the Nelson family, early residents in the area. The West Point Foundry Association's operations supported many of the residents of the settlement, directly or indirectly. It was incorporated as a village in 1855. The post office opened in 1888.

Geography
Nelsonville is located at  (41.424550, -73.944170).

Immediately to the north of Nelsonville is the tourist hot spot, Mount Taurus, known to residents of Nelsonville as Bull Hill.

Demographics

As of the census of 2000, there were 565 people, 222 households, and 154 families residing in the village. The population density was 541.6 people per square mile (209.8/km2). There were 246 housing units at an average density of 235.8 per square mile (91.3/km2). The racial makeup of the village was 96.28% White, 1.77% African American, 0.35% Asian, 0.71% from other races, and 0.88% from two or more races. Hispanic or Latino of any race were 3.72% of the population.

There were 222 households, out of which 29.7% had children under the age of 18 living with them, 53.6% were married couples living together, 10.4% had a female householder with no husband present, and 30.6% were non-families. 22.5% of all households were made up of individuals, and 6.8% had someone living alone who was 65 years of age or older. The average household size was 2.50 and the average family size was 2.99.

In the village, the population was spread out, with 24.2% under the age of 18, 4.8% from 18 to 24, 31.7% from 25 to 44, 27.4% from 45 to 64, and 11.9% who were 65 years of age or older. The median age was 40 years. For every 100 females, there were 102.5 males. For every 100 females age 18 and over, there were 103.8 males.

The median income for a household in the village was $60,000, and the median income for a family was $67,778. Males had a median income of $42,206 versus $45,625 for females. The per capita income for the village was $24,853. About 3.6% of families and 7.7% of the population were below the poverty line, including 6.1% of those under age 18 and 3.1% of those age 65 or over.

References

External links
 Village of Nelsonville
 The Highlands Current

Villages in New York (state)
Villages in Putnam County, New York